Ludvika Municipality (Ludvika kommun) is a municipality in Dalarna County, central Sweden. It has its seat in the town of Ludvika.

In 1971 the City of Ludvika (itself instituted as such in 1919) was amalgamated with the adjacent municipalities of Grangärde and Säfsnäs, forming the present entity.

Localities 
Figures as of 2004.

Ludvika 13,724
Grängesberg 3,356
Sunnansjö 758
Saxdalen 752
Fredriksberg 741
Nyhammar 682
Sörvik 540
Blötberget 529
Persbo/Gräsberg 459
Gonäs 432
Landforsen/Håksberg 438
Grangärde 374
 Other/countryside 2,967

Economy 
Largest employers in Ludvika:
 Hitachi ABB Power Grids 2,400
 County medical facilities 600
 Spendrups brewery  285
 VBU Västerbergslagens Utbildningscentrum 220
 RSV Tax Office 110
 Samhall-gruppen 80
 GIA Industri AB 75
 Brunnsviks folkhögskola 75
 Connex Sverige AB 70
 Seco Tools AB 70
 ISS Cleaning 60

Riksdag elections

Twin Towns & Sister cities 
Ludvika has three twin towns:
Bad Honnef, Germany  
Imatra, Finland   
Kontiolahti, Finland

Sports 

Many sport teams have their origins in Ludvika Municipality. The soccer teams "Östansbo IS" (ÖIS), "Ludvika FK" (LFK, male) and "IFK Ludvika" (female) come from Ludvika and play in divisions 4 and 3. All three also have junior teams. There is also an ice-hockey team, Ludvika Hockey Förening Lightning. Other teams include ping-pong teams as well as other sports.

References

External links 

Ludvika - Official site

Municipalities of Dalarna County